Type 133 may refer to:

 Lotus Type 133, a vehicle
 Bristol Type 133, an aircraft
 , a Peugeot vehicle